The 2001 VIP Petfoods Queensland 500 was an endurance race for V8 Supercars held at Queensland Raceway near Ipswich in Queensland, Australia on 26 August 2001. The programmed race distance was 161 laps (approx 500 km) however the race was stopped due to heavy rain and results were declared as at the completion of 156 laps.

The event was Round 9 of the 2001 Shell Championship Series and it was the third Queensland 500 V8 Supercar race.

Race results

Qualifying

Top-Fifteen Shootout 

The Top Fifteen Shootout was contested by the top fifteen cars from qualifying to determine grid positions 1 through 15 for the race.

Race

Championship Standings

External links
  2001 VIP Petfoods Queensland 500 photos from www.v8supercar.com via web.archive.org

References

VIP Petfoods Queensland 500
Queensland 500
Pre-Bathurst 500